Mahammed Boun Abdallah Dionne (born 22 September 1959) is a Senegalese politician who served as the Prime Minister of Senegal from 2014 to 2019. He was the third prime minister appointed by President Macky Sall. Dionne served at the Central Bank of West African States, the United Nations Industrial Development Organization (ONUDI), and as the advisor of the president, before his appointment as prime minister. He is a computer engineer by training.

Early life
Dionne was born on 22 September 1959, in Gossas. When his mother gave birth to him, she took refuge in a locality where her grandmother lived. His father worked as a police commissioner.

Political career
Dionne worked as an engineer specializing in applied economics, and worked in a West African bank and as head of the Economic Office at the Senegalese Embassy in France. He was Director of the Cabinet of Prime Minister Macky Sall from 2005 to 2007, and when Sall moved to the post of President of the National Assembly in 2007–2008, Dionne continued working under Sall in the same capacity. Prior to his appointment as Prime Minister, he served from March to July 2014 as Minister for the Implementation of the Emerging Senegal Plan (PSE), an economic and social development plan to make the country an emerging economy by 2035.

He headed the national candidate list of Benno Bokk Yaakaar, the coalition supporting President Sall, in the July 2017 parliamentary election. Following the victory of Benno Bokk Yaakaar, President Sall reappointed Dionne as Prime Minister on 6 September 2017.

Awards and honours
:
 Grand Cross of the National Order of Merit (9 July 2015)
 Officer of the National Order of the Lion

References

1959 births
Living people
Prime Ministers of Senegal
People from Fatick Region
Computer engineers
Recipients of orders, decorations, and medals of Senegal